Matias Collins (born May 25, 1970) is an American, Argentinian and Italian sailor. As sailor he competed in many Soling World, European, North American and South American Championships since 1997

Personal and professional life 
Collins was born May 25, 1970, in Hartford, Connecticut. He is married. The couple has three children.

Collins holds a bachelor in food technology. He is since 2003 the secretary of the International Soling Association.

Sailing career
Together with Gustavo Warburg (helmsman) and Maximo Smith he took the 1999 South American Championship in the Soling while sailing for Argentina. This team won as well the 1998 Argentinian Championship and 1998 Uruguayan Championship both in the Soling. In 2018 Matias won the bronze as helmsman in the South American Championship together with Tomas Morgan and Mariano Cambon in the Soling while sailing for the USA.

References

Living people
1970 births
American male sailors (sport)
South American Champions Soling
Sportspeople from Connecticut